Borokiae is a superorder of bicosoecids, a small group of unicellular flagellates, included among the heterokonts.

Classification 
 Order Borokales Cavalier-Smith 2006
 Family Borokidae Cavalier-Smith 2006
 Genus Boroka Cavalier-Smith 2006

References

External links 
 
 Borokiae at WoRMS

Bikosea
Eukaryote superorders